Mummy Cave is a rock shelter and archeological site in Park County, Wyoming, United States, near the eastern entrance to Yellowstone National Park.

It lies along the left bank of the river, next to the mouth of a small stream and opposite from the mouth of Blackwater Creek. The largest known cave along the North Fork, it is believed to have been carved by the river's flow; the reason for its diversion away from the alcove is unknown.

Mummy Cave was occupied between 7280 BC and AD 1580. Discovered by Cody resident Gene Smith in 1957, it was first studied in 1962 and excavated by the Buffalo Bill Historical Center. The site includes unusual amounts of perishable materials such as hide, feathers and wood, as well as the buried and mummified remains of an inhabitant, named by researchers "Mummy Joe," and dated to about AD 800. The deposits have been classified into 38 occupation levels that represent at least seasonal use of the site on an annual basis, extending from the Paleoindian period to the late Prehistoric period.

Geology

Although it is referred to as a "cave", Mummy Cave is actually a broad, shallow alcove in a vertical cliff. It owes its depth to its overall size and the stability of the parent rock. By the time it was discovered, the alcove had been almost entirely filled with alluvium. The cliff is composed of Tertiary period volcanic ash mixed with larger rock fragments of volcanic origin. A similar alcove is being cut by the Shoshone at the mouth of Clocktower Creek. The cave fill has accumulated for at least 10,000 years and appears to have originated from nearby debris fans formed where weathered material has flowed down channels in neighboring cliffs.

Apart from the depth and consistent nature of the alluvium, Mummy Cave is also characterized by extreme dryness. The pointed shape of the cliff above prevents rain and meltwater from percolating through the rock to the cave, and there are no vertical joints in the rock above.

Archeological investigation
The investigation of Mummy Cave was led by Robert Edgar from 1963 to 1965. The alcove was marked out into a  grid, with a permanent reference mark for elevation marked on the wall. Initial investigation focused on establishing stratigraphy. Once the layers of alluvium in the cave floor were established, the excavation proceeded layer by layer. The excavations terraced the cave floor into  levels, following the established reference grid. Digging was done with hand trowels in the artifact-bearing layers while layers devoid of artifacts were excavated with shovels. Spoils were disposed of down the embankment.

The relic hunters appear to have stopped when they encountered a rock cairn that covered what proved to be a human burial site.

During the 1964 season layers 29–35 were removed and some zones were excavated much more deeply. In 1965 layers 24–28 were removed from the central area of the alcove. By this time it was clear that excavation would proceed for the full depth of the site, and that the disposal of a considerable quantity of excavated debris would need to be addressed. A bulldozer was brought in to remove sections of fill beyond the drip line of the shelter. The 1966 season was directed by Wilfred M. Husted. Results of the Mummy Cave investigations were published in Science in 1968.

Results
The excavation of Mummy Cave yielded a nearly continuous succession of artifacts, which span a period of over 9000 years. The artifacts were disposed in a manner that permitted dating in both relative terms through stratigraphy, as well as through radiocarbon dating to establish an absolute scale. This continuum has proved to be invaluable in relating and dating other excavations in the Rocky Mountain region. In particular, the stone projectile points found at Mummy Cave have been used to set the standard for classifying stone arrowheads and spear heads in the region. The point typology has been extrapolated to define cultural and commercial relationships between peoples throughout the American West. Stratigraphy and carbon dating indicate that Mummy Cave was first occupied near the end of the Pinedale glaciation. Later occupancy spanned the Altithermal, followed by a cooler climate from about 1000 BC.

The earliest layers at Mummy Cave yielded a few prismatic stone blades dating to about 7300 BC. Several layers contained no artifacts and were defined by soot layers. By layer 6 the first parallel-oblique points appeared. By Layer 8, roughly corresponding to 6500 BC, the cultural evidence became continuous. Layers 8, 9, 10 and 12 produced lanceolate or leaf-shaped projectile points which have been interpreted as corresponding to Angostura-style points. This implies that the inhabitants of Mummy Cave during this era were big-game hunters from the Great Plains who adapted to the mountain environment. In layer 16, radiocarbon dated to 5630 BC, a new type of point appeared. These Blackwater side-notched points implied the arrival of a group from eastern Nebraska or western Iowa, replacing the previous group which may have moved to the north. The presence of such points suggests a connection with the Simonsen site in northeastern Iowa, which has been dated to the Early Archaic period. This transition coincided with the climatic shift to the Altithermal. Side-notched points recovered from layers 21, 24 and 28 imply a return of the previous inhabitants; the easterners had moved on to the central Columbian Plateau.

Layer 30 was dated to 2470±150 BC. Layer 32 was dated to 870±135 BC. It is hypothesized that layers 32–38 represent the presence of people of the Shoshonean culture, with increasingly definitive Shoshonean artifacts present from layer 36 onward, including cordage and basketwork. Layer 38 yielded gray flat-bottomed pottery of Shoshonean manufacture. Layer 36 is notable as the source of the "mummy." The desiccated body of an adult male covered by a sheepskin garment with fur and feather ornament was recovered from this layer and dated to about AD 770 by radiocarbon dating.

Several thousand animal bones were discovered in Mummy Cave. While the large majority of the bones could not be identified, researchers at the University of Texas at El Paso (UTEP) were able to determine the biological origins of over two thousand bones. As at many other archeological sites in the region, significant numbers of Bighorn Sheep (Ovis canadensis) and deer from the genus Odocoileus were identified. Of particular interest to biologists was the much larger number of sheep than deer: eighty-eight sheep and fifteen deer were identified. Such a prevalence of sheep over deer is highly unusual for archeological sites in the region, because deer are equally or more plentiful in areas such as the one in which Mummy Cave is located. This anomaly has led researchers at UTEP to propose that the site was used as a home base for hunters to operate at higher altitudes.

The wide range of artifacts discovered at the site has caused Mummy Cave to be seen as a highly significant site for the study of Rocky Mountain archeology. The cave's significance was recognized by the National Park Service with its placement on the National Register of Historic Places in 1981.

See also 

Archaeology of the Americas
Arlington Springs Man – (Human remains)
Calico Early Man Site – (Archeological site)
Cueva de las Manos – (Cave paintings)
Buhl Woman – (Human remains)
Fort Rock Cave – (Archeological site)
Kennewick Man – (Human remains)
Kwäday Dän Ts’ìnchi – (Human remains)
Marmes Rockshelter – (Archeological site)
Paisley Caves – (Archeological site)

References

External links
Mummy Cave at the Wyoming State Historic Preservation Office

Archaeological sites on the National Register of Historic Places in Wyoming
Archaic period in North America
Geography of Park County, Wyoming
Rock shelters in the United States
Shoshone National Forest
National Register of Historic Places in Park County, Wyoming